Pyin Oo Lwin  District is a district of the Mandalay Region in central Burma. It lies northeast of Mandalay, with the Myitnge River as its southern boundary. To the east it is bordered by Shan State and in part by the Chaung Magyi (Chaung means stream).  It goes north as far as the town of Dakaung where it adjoins Htigyaing Township, Katha District in Sagaing Region. Its western boundary, is for the most part the Irrawaddy, but a very small portion of Thabeikkyin Township is west of the Irrawaddy, near the town of Baw in Sagaing Region. To the southwest it borders Mandalay District.

Townships
The district contains the following townships:

Pyinoolwin Township (Maymyo Township) 
Madaya Township (Matayar Township) 
Singu Township (Sint Ku Township) 
Thabeikkyin Township (Tha Pate Kyin Township) 
Mogok Township (Mogote Township)

Notes

 
Districts of Myanmar
Mandalay Region